The 2010 Kraft Nabisco Championship was played at Mission Hills Country Club in Rancho Mirage, California, from April 1–4. This was the 39th edition of the Kraft Nabisco Championship and the 28th as a women's major golf championship.

This championship was won by Yani Tseng, age 21, with a score of 275 (−13), one stroke over runner-up Suzann Pettersen. This was her third victory on the LPGA Tour and her second major title. ESPN and CBS Sports televised the event.

Past champions in the field

Made the cut

Missed the cut

Source:

Round summaries

First round
Thursday, April 1, 2010

Source:

Second round
Friday, April 2, 2010

Source:

Third round
Saturday, April 3, 2010

Source:

Final round
Sunday, April 4, 2010

Source:

Scorecard
Final round
 
Cumulative tournament scores, relative to par

Source:

References

External links
Golf Observer leaderboard

Chevron Championship
Golf in California
Kraft Nabisco Championship
Kraft Nabisco Championship
Kraft Nabisco Championship
Kraft Nabisco Championship